The Central Electricity Board (CEB) is the power generation and distribution agency on the island of Mauritius.

History and establishment 
The Board was formally constituted and held its first meeting on 8 December 1952. Prior to the formation of CEB, electricity was generated by a number of private companies which owned and operated the Réduit Station (Mauritius Hydro Electric Company of Atchia brothers), the Cascade Cécile (Darné family), and the Tamarind Falls Power Station (GES Company). The Brazzell Report of 1949 recommended the formation of CEB following a study commissioned by the Colonial Government.

References

External links 

Government agencies of Mauritius
Government agencies established in 1952